Pterochaos irroratus is a species of beetle in the family Cerambycidae, and the only species in the genus Pterochaos.

References

Sternotomini
Beetles described in 1793